Eduardo del Llano Rodriguez (born 9 October 1962 in Moscow) is a Cuban writer, university professor, film director, producer and screenwriter.

Del Llano graduated with an Art History degree from the University of Havana in 1985. In 1982 he founded the comedy theatre and literary quartet NOS-Y-OTROS that existed until 1997.  From 1990 to 1995 he taught History of Latin American art and History of Photography at the Faculty of Arts and Letters at the University of Havana.

With the short film Monte Rouge, a satire on the work of Cuban state security, he seemingly emerged as a critic of the Cuban government.

References 
 
 Biography at cubaliteraria.com (Spanish)
 Biography at cubaunderground.com (Spanish)
 Official Youtube-Channel of Eduardo del Llano (Spanish, English subtitles)

Cuban film producers
1962 births
Living people
Cuban film directors
Cuban screenwriters
Cuban male writers
Male screenwriters
University of Havana alumni
Academic staff of University of Havana